João Dionisio Filgueira Barreto Amoêdo (born 22 October 1962 in Rio de Janeiro), also known as João Amoêdo, is a Brazilian banker,
engineer and businessman. He is one of the founders of the New Party (NOVO), which he presided from September 2015 to July 2017, and was its candidate in the Brazilian presidential election of 2018.

Personal life
João Amoêdo is son of radiologist doctor Armando Rocha Amoêdo and business owner Maria Elisa Filgueira Barreto. In 1987, Amoêdo married Rosa Helena Nasser and together they have three daughters. Always dedicated to sports, he completed 6 Ironman and more than 10 marathons. In 2010, after recovering from a lymphoma, Amoêdo went back to his usual routine, including the sports. He remains active to this day.

Founding the New Party
In 2009, during a talk with friends, Amoêdo showed himself frustrated with the amount of taxes paid and the disproportionate level of public services provided in return by the government. He started to question the possibility of involving examples of private initiative to improve public services with great management, meritocracy, and transparency.

After talks with politicians, he concluded that the only way to improve the lives of people is to bring new leadership to public life, creating a new institution - a political party different from the existing ones. The goal was to build a tool that would enable people that were never involved in politics but had an interest in it, and truly wanted to make a change, to participate. The only certainty, according to Amoêdo, was that the current politicians were not doing a good job, and the people had to get involved in order for true change to come about.

Along with 181 citizens, those of 35 different professions and native from 10 different states from the Federation, found NOVO on 12 February 2011. On 15 September 2015, Novo had its definitive register approved and Amoêdo became the president of the party, withdrawn from office since July 2017.

Political views

He is in favor of defense of individual liberties for understanding that the free market is the business environment that works better for everyone, that the individual is the main wealth generator and that he is an agent of changes. Founder of New Party, Amoêdo states that everyone elected by the party will follow the liberal ideal, with State reduction, greater autonomy of the individual and the reduction of taxes. About Bolsa Família, Amoêdo says in a column in Brazilian newspaper Folha de S. Paulo that the program would be "what brings one of the best returns in relation of the amount [of money] invested", but that it doesn't show a "clear way out".

References

External links
 
 
 

|-

|-

1962 births
Living people
People from Rio de Janeiro (city)
Federal University of Rio de Janeiro alumni
Pontifical Catholic University of Rio de Janeiro alumni
Brazilian engineers
Brazilian libertarians
Economic liberalism
New Party (Brazil) politicians
Brazilian anti-communists